The UEFA European Under-18 Championship 1994 Final Tournament was held in Spain. It also served as the European qualification for the 1995 FIFA World Youth Championship.

Teams

The following teams qualified for the tournament:

 
 
 
 
 
 
  (host)

Group stage

Group A

Group B

Fifth-place match

Third place match

Final

Qualification to World Youth Championship
The five best performing teams qualified for the 1995 FIFA World Youth Championship.

See also
 1994 UEFA European Under-18 Championship qualifying

External links
Results by RSSSF

UEFA European Under-19 Championship
1994
Under-18
Under-18
UEFA Under-19
1994 in youth association football